Bryan Freedman is an American entertainment lawyer and litigator. He is co-founder of the Los Angeles–based law firm Freedman & Taitelman LLP. Freedman is known for representing many high-profile defendants in the entertainment industry, including actors, sportspeople as well as motion pictures and television companies, among others.

Bryan Freedman also represented several parties represented by the Sony Pictures hack and was instrumental in the US$500 million litigation related to the Michael Jackson Estate's debt.

Education and personal life
Bryan Freedman attended McGeorge School of Law. Continuing his studies at the University of California, Berkeley, he attained his Juris Doctor in 1991. Freedman lives with his family in the Los Angeles Metropolitan Area. His son Spencer Freedman is a college basketball player for the Harvard Crimson of the Ivy League.

Career
After graduating from law school, Freedman was admitted to the California State Bar in 1991. Bryan Freedman met his business partner Michael Taitelman while in law school at the University of California at Berkeley. In 1997 they founded Freedman & Taitelman LLP, a law firm mostly representing clients from the entertainment industry. Since 1997, Freedman has gradually established his reputation as a celebrity lawyer through a series of high-profile cases.

Lawsuits and legal disputes

Settlement paid for sexual assault of a minor
"Top Hollywood lawyer Bryan Freedman paid a $40,000 settlement after being accused of gang-raping a 17-year-old while in college." https://www.businessinsider.com/bryan-freedman-hollywood-lawyer-sexual-assault-lawsuit-college-2022-11

Chris Harrison
Bryan Freedman represented Chris Harrison, an American television and game show host after Harrison faced criticism for defending a contestant on The Bachelor accused of racism. During a controversial interview with former Bachelorette star Rachel Lindsay, Harrison defended former contestant Rachael Kirkconnell for attending an "Old South" ball in 2018 with her sorority at Georgia College & State University. The ball was hosted by Kappa Alpha Order (KA), a collegiate fraternity with historical ties to the Ku Klux Klan that claims Robert E. Lee as its "spiritual founder".

Following public criticism, Harrison had to depart the franchise. According to a number of sources, Freedman was hired to negotiate an eight figure payout from the network.

Gabrielle Union
Gabrielle Union was a judge for America's Got Talent for its fourteenth season, but the show failed to renew her contract for another season in November 2019, allegedly after she spoke out against racism. Union's fellow America's Got Talent judge Julianne Hough's contract was also declined to be renewed. In May 2020 Union filed a discrimination suit against the producers of America's Got Talent, citing racism and prejudice. As Page Six notes, "Freedman repped Union in her dispute with “AGT" last year after she complained of racism and a "toxic environment" on the talent show and had been let go as a judge. The case was settled in September. Freedman in June had filed a complaint with California's Department of Fair Employment and Housing on Union's behalf, after NBC had wrapped its own investigation."

Michael Jackson Estate
Bryan Freedman was instrumental (along with Howard Weitzman and executors John Branca and John McClain) in handling the estate's disputed debt left after Michael Jackson's death. In particular, Freedman successfully handled $100 million Leaving Neverland lawsuit against the HBO and $500 million worth of the estate's debt.

Notable clients
Jeff Ross
Vin Diesel
Megyn Kelly
Kevin Spacey
Mariah Carey
Robert Downey Jr.
Julia Roberts
Lil Pump
Christopher Nolan
Kate Beckinsale
Linkin Park
Deborah Dugan
Diplo
FKA twigs
Octavia Spencer
Rebel Entertainment (talent agency)

Extra links
Freedman & Taitelman LLP
The Lawyers of Distinction

References

Living people
Year of birth missing (living people)
20th-century American lawyers
21st-century American lawyers
Lawyers from Los Angeles
University of California, Berkeley alumni
McGeorge School of Law alumni